Pisidium henslowanum is a species of very small freshwater clam or pea clam, an aquatic bivalve mollusc in the family Sphaeriidae. It is commonly referred to as the Henslow peaclam.

Etymology
The specific name honours John Stevens Henslow.

Description
The shell is obliquely oval. It has prominent, narrow umbos well behind the middle and the umbos have oblique raised crests. The surface (periostracum) is  silky with fine, even concentric striae. The colour is greyish, especially at the umbos. Widespread but local and uncommon. The size is 3.5-5mm.

Distribution
Its native distribution is Holarctic.

 Czech Republic – in Bohemia, in Moravia, least concern (LC)
 Slovakia
 Germany – (Arten der Vorwarnliste)
 Nordic countries: Denmark, Faroes, Finland, Norway and Sweden (not in Iceland)
Great Britain and Ireland

References

External links
 Pisidium henslowanum  at Animalbase taxonomy,short description, biology,status (threats), images
Images at BOLD.

henslowanum
Bivalves described in 1823